Yang Zhongjian, also Yang Chung-chien (1 June 1897 – 15 January 1979), courtesy name Keqiang, also known as C.C. (Chung Chien) Young, was a Chinese paleontologist and zoologist. He was one of China's foremost vertebrate paleontologists. He has been called the "Father of Chinese Vertebrate Paleontology".

Biography

Yang was born in Hua County, Shaanxi, China. He graduated from the Department of Geology of Peking University in 1923, and in 1927 received his doctorate from the University of Munich in Germany.  In 1928 he worked for the Cenozoic Research Laboratory of the Geological Survey of China and took charge of excavations at the Peking Man Site at Zhoukoudian.

He held professorial posts at the Geological Survey of China, Peking University, and Northwest University in Xi'an. Yang's scientific work was instrumental in the creation of China's Institute of Vertebrate Paleontology and Paleoanthropology in Beijing, which today houses one of the most important collections of fossil vertebrates in the world. He was director of both the IVPP and the Beijing Natural History Museum.

He supervised the collection of fossil remains of and research on dinosaurs in China from 1933 until the 1970s.  He presided over some of the most important fossil discoveries in history, such as those of the prosauropods, Lufengosaurus and Yunnanosaurus; the ornithopod, Tsintaosaurus; and the gigantic sauropod, Mamenchisaurus; as well as China's first stegosaur, Chialingosaurus.

Legacy

Yang's cremated remains are interred behind the museum at the Zhoukoudian site alongside those of his colleagues, Pei Wenzhong and Jia Lanpo.

In 2007, when Lü Junchang and colleagues described a second species of Yunnanosaurus, they named it Yunnanosaurus youngi in Yang's honour.

References

Further reading
 

1897 births
1979 deaths
20th-century Chinese zoologists
Chinese paleontologists
Academic staff of Beijing Normal University
Biologists from Shaanxi
Academic staff of Chongqing University
Ludwig Maximilian University of Munich alumni
Members of Academia Sinica
Members of the Chinese Academy of Sciences
Academic staff of the Northwest University (China)
Paleontology in Shaanxi
National University of Peking alumni
Academic staff of Peking University
People from Weinan
Victims of the Cultural Revolution